The Wolseong Nuclear Power Plant, or Wolsong, is a nuclear power plant located on the coast near Nae-ri, Yangnm-myeon, Gyeongju, North Gyeongsang province, South Korea. It is the only South Korean nuclear power plant operating CANDU-type PHWR (Pressurized Heavy Water Reactors). Korea Hydro & Nuclear Power owns the plant.  These reactors are capable of consuming multiple types of fuel, including wastes from South Korea's other nuclear plants.

The power plant site including Yangnam-myeon. Yangbuk-myeon and Gampo-eup was designated an industrial infrastructure development zone in 1976. Construction of Wolseong 1 started in 1976 and was completed in 1982. In the following year, the power plant began commercial operations. This PHWR reactor has a gross generation capacity of 678 MW. Wolseong reactors 2, 3 and 4 were completed in 1997, 1998 and 1999, respectively. Each of these reactors has a capacity of 700 MW. Wolseong Nuclear Plant has since operated successfully.

Wolseong Nuclear Power Plant supplies about 5% of South Korea's electricity.

Shin-Wolsong Nuclear Power Plant
Shin-Wolsong No. 1 and No. 2, are two new OPR-1000 type pressurized water reactors. Shin-Wolsong 1 became fully operational in July 2012.

In June 2013 Shin-Wolsong 1 was shutdown, and Shin-Wolsong 2 ordered to remain offline, until safety-related control cabling with forged safety certificates is replaced. Shin Wolsong-1 was approved for restart in January 2014. In November 2014, Shin Wolsong-2 loaded its first core of nuclear fuel, and the plant was connected to the grid in February 2015, with commercial operation commencing in July 2015.

See also

Kori Nuclear Power Plant
Nuclear power in South Korea
List of nuclear reactors#South Korea

References

External links
Nuclear power > Wolseong at Korea Nuclear Energy Foundation

Nuclear power stations in South Korea
Buildings and structures in Gyeongju
Nuclear power stations using CANDU reactors
1983 establishments in South Korea
20th-century architecture in South Korea